Boncuklu Tarla is an archaeological site in the Southeastern Anatolia of Turkey. It is the remains of a settlement occupied from the Late Epipalaeolithic to Pre-Pottery Neolithic B periods. It was discovered in 2008 during an archaeological survey in advance of the construction of the Ilısu Dam and has been excavated by a team from Mardin Museum since 2012.

The discovery of a large communal building with stone pillars was reported at Boncuklu Tarla in 2019, prompting comparisons to Göbekli Tepe. It is an early example of rectangular plan architecture. The excavators also claimed to have found a sewer system, which if confirmed would be the oldest known in the world.

Discovery

Boncuklu Tarla was discovered in the district of Dargeçit in Mardin Province in 2008. The discovery was made during a prospecting dig near Ilisu dam. The site underwent its first excavation in 2012 under the auspices of the Mardin Museum then followed by a second excavation by Dr. Ergül Kodaş of the University of Mardin Artuklu in 2017  The temple found at Boncuklu Tarla is from the same period as Göbeklitepe. Ibrahim Ozcosar, a Turkish university rector has made statements claiming Boncuklu Tarla is older than Göbeklitepe  (Gunes, 2019).

Excavation

The 2012 excavation of Boncuklu Tarla had a scope of “studies for the Documentation and Rescue of Cultural Assets Remaining in the Interaction Area of the Ilısu Dam and HES Project” around the rural neighbourhood of Ilisu. More than 15 restorers and archaeologists have assisted in the excavation of the area with the aid of 50 workers. The excavations continued in 2017 by initiating excavation on the eastern sector of Boncuklu Tarla. In 2019 this excavation revealed this section of the site was occupied by three different phases during the tenth millennium. The excavation uncovered four types of building structures, a sewage system and over two dozen artifacts. Among artifacts found at Boncuklu Tarla were thousands of beads for ornaments, obsidian or flint blades and tools used to cut stone. Tools discovered also included blades, gimlets, arrowheads and microliths.

Geography and Environment

Boncuklu Tarla is located in Eastern Turkey within the Mardin Province. The site sits approximately 125 km east of the city of Mardin within the district of Dargecit. Boncuklu Tarla is located at 37.529444°N 41.832361°E and within 1.5 km of the Tigris River. Due to the site’s proximity to the river, it is highly likely Boncuklu Tarla underwent many phases of flooding as many riverine communities were. This supports that there were phases in the construction of the site, which was recognised by the site’s archaeologists. Some parts of Boncuklu Tarla were constructed on the bedrock of the location.

Chronology

This area is known to have had many established civilisations such as the Sumerian, Akkadians, Babylonians, Hittities, Urartians, Romans, Abbasids, Seljuks and Ottomans. Analysis was done on-site as well as C14 calibration and laboratory studies to determine that at least six levels of occupation occurred at Boncuklu Tarla. These six levels include the Late Pre-Pottery Neolithic B, middle Pre-Pottery Neolithic B, old Pre-Pottery Neolithic B, the transition from Pre-Pottery Neolithic B to Pre-Pottery Neolithic A and the later Epipa-leolithic.

Architecture

Boncuklu Tarla has four forms of spaces within the village. The first is the communal building followed by domestic housing, storage spaces and non-constructed communal spaces. The communal building, sometimes referred to as the temple, is located in the centre amongst houses varying in shape and size. These homes are either circular or sub rectangular in shape while the communal building is the only structure that is rectangular. This construction came about during the tenth millennium BCE when rectangular buildings were first revealed. The rectangular plan was slow to be adopted systematically during this time. Therefore, the adoption of this structure shape may have started with the construction of the Boncuklu Tarla communal. The head of the excavation team has stated that there may have been buildings up to eight stories high, reaching a height of seven meters.

The communal building of Boncuklu Tarla has five architecturally insignificant buttresses on the eastern and western walls. The eastern wall has two well preserved buttresses while the western has three that are damaged. The western and eastern buttresses do not perfectly align nor are they positioned in line with the four pillars located in the centre of the building. These types of buttresses are well established at Çayönü, Göbekli Tepe,  and  Karahan  Tepe  yet Boncuklu Tarla’s differ in that they do not align with the communal buildings symmetrical pillars. Unlike Çayönü the buttresses at Boncuklu Tarla’s purpose was not structural but in fact only provided spatial differentiation to the interior. All the buttress’s measure at approximately 50 cm in length and 30 cm in depth. The north wall on the north-easter corner also contains a niche measuring at 40 x 40 cm.

Surrounding the Communal building at Boncuklu Tarla three other sub rectangular building were uncovered. They were named Strata II, III and VII and all measured between 8–10 metres in length and 4–5 metres in width. Stratum II has entirely independent walls while Stratum II and VII both share common walls with the communal building to the west and east, respectively. The excavation has uncovered that the three structures also have buttresses at the front of their entrances, near the angle of the wall course. Beaten and smoothed over earth makes up the floor of the three buildings.

Two circular buildings have been found at Boncuklu Tarla. These structures also share the beaten floor and buttress features that the sub rectangular buildings have, however, some parts also contain pebbled flooring. Both the circular structures have extensions off their entrances, one rectangular and the other circular. The building located to the North named is Stratum IV and the other, situated to the west, is named Stratum VI.

References

Archaeological sites of prehistoric Anatolia
2008 archaeological discoveries
Archaeological sites in Southeastern Anatolia
Pre-Pottery Neolithic B
Dargeçit District